Evert Mul (18 January 1909 – 16 February 1974) was a Dutch footballer. He played in one match for the Netherlands national football team in 1936.

References

External links
 

1909 births
1974 deaths
Dutch footballers
Netherlands international footballers
Place of birth missing
Association footballers not categorized by position